Chadwick Farmhouse is a historic home located at Duanesburg in Schenectady County, New York. It was built about 1870 and is a two-story, five bay frame building with picturesque, late-Victorian style eclectic features.  It features a truncated hipped roof with prominent cross gables.  Also on the property is a contributing dairy and springhouse.

The property was covered in a 1984 study of Duanesburg historical resources.
It was listed on the National Register of Historic Places in 1984.

References

Houses on the National Register of Historic Places in New York (state)
Houses in Schenectady County, New York
Victorian architecture in New York (state)
Houses completed in 1870
National Register of Historic Places in Schenectady County, New York